The Mouseheart series is an ongoing series of children's adventure novels by Lisa Fiedler. The series currently comprises three books, the first of which was released in 2014 by Margaret K. McElderry Books.

Plot overview
The series follows Hopper, a pet store mouse that escapes, only to end up in Atlantia, a colony created entirely of rats that lie underneath the city of Brooklyn. He quickly makes friends, however, he also finds that rebels and other troubles constantly plague the colony.

Main characters
Hopper
He is the main character, and very loyal and brave.
Pinkie
She is Hopper's sister and is stubborn and fierce. The second book mentions that she is 'cold hearted' but later on is described as having a 'broken heart'.
Pup
The younger brother of Hopper and Pinkie. He is a caring fellow, who turns cold, but later on turns remorseful.
Zucker
The rat prince of Atlantia and son of Titus. He played a major role in the destruction of Atlantia's refugee camps.
Firren
Leader of the rebel rats and an ally of the Mūs. She later on becomes the wife of Zucker and Queen of Atlantia. 
Emperor Titus
The evil rat king of Atlantia and father of Zucker. He struck an accord with cat queen, Felina, with a dark secret behind it.
Felina
The evil cat queen of the tunnels, she holds a nasty reputation with the citizens of Atlantia and the Mūs.

Books
Mouseheart (2014)
Hopper's Destiny (2015)
Return of the Forgotten (2015)

Critical reception
Critical reception has been positive and the series has been routinely recommended to fans of animal fantasy. The Bulletin of the Center for Children's Books gave a mixed review for the first book in the series, commenting "To’s occasional black and white digital illustrations are a little more cuddly than the text, but any kid who sees the glossy jacket illustration will know instantly who the bad guys are in the story despite the narrative’s laboriously slow reveal of that information. Fans of Hunter’s Warriors series or Jacques’ Redwall series may enjoy this, but kids who want a little more depth to their animal fantasy will want to look elsewhere." Booklist was similarly mixed in their reviews, as they praised the first book but stated that the second book had limited general appeal.

References

External links
 

American children's novels
Children's novels about animals
Fictional mice and rats
American young adult novels
Books about mice and rats